Contomastix vittata is a species of teiid lizard endemic to Bolivia.

References

vittata
Reptiles of Bolivia
Endemic fauna of Bolivia
Reptiles described in 1902
Taxa named by George Albert Boulenger